Naval Weapons Station Seal Beach is a United States Navy weapons and munitions loading, storage and maintenance facility located in Seal Beach, California, with detachments in Fallbrook and Norco, both also in California. It also encloses the Seal Beach National Wildlife Refuge.

Location and infrastructure
NWS Seal Beach occupies 5,256 acres (8.2 square miles (21 km²)), has 230 buildings and 128 ammunition depots providing 589,299 feet² (54,747 m²) of ammunition storage space.  Ammunition was moved from storage to the docks on 56 miles (90 km) of railroad line which closed in 2008 and the tracks were taken out in 2010, after which 80 miles (128 km) of road are used instead.  The base owned 130 pieces of railroad rolling stock which were dismantled, their function being taken up by 230 trucks and trailers to move the ammunition, which is loaded onto ships using six mobile cranes that can lift up to 90 tons (81 tonnes).

The station is bounded on the north by the combined Interstate 405 and State Route 22; on the west by Seal Beach Boulevard; on the south west by the Pacific Ocean; on the south east by the Bolsa Chica Channel and Edinger Avenue; and on the east by the Bolsa Chica Channel and Bolsa Chica Road.  From Edinger Avenue to Interstate 405, a distance of about three miles, all roads to the east of the station terminate at Bolsa Chica Road, with the exception of Westminster Boulevard, which runs through the center of the facility, separated by a chain-link fence on both sides.  Edinger Avenue enters the facility, but public access terminates at an emergency gate.  On the west side of the station south of Interstate 405, Westminster Boulevard and the Pacific Coast Highway are the only public roads running through any part of the station.

Memorial
The Weapons Station is also home to the World War II National Submarine Memorial - West.  The Memorial is dedicated to the over 3000 submariners who lost their lives in United States submarines in the 52 submarines lost during World War II.  There are also plaques dedicated to those who lost their lives in submarine accidents during the Cold War.  The Memorial is located outside the main entrance to the Weapons Station on Seal Beach Boulevard and is accessible to the public.

Environment
The Seal Beach National Wildlife Refuge is a 920 acre (4 km²) salt marsh located within the boundaries of the Weapons Station.

An Installation Restoration (IR) project is underway at the base to clean up environmental hazards and restore damaged areas. Working with a Restoration Advisory Board made up of representatives from the surrounding community, a total of 73 sites needing attention were identified. Studies of the recommended sites were done and 46 were found to have no contamination and required no intervention. Five facilities were permitted and are still in use and were removed from the IR program. As of September 2005 responsibility for two underground tanks was transferred to other agencies with expertise in such tanks. Seven sites have had the cleanup process completed with 13 other sites in the process of analysis or cleanup. The remaining 13 sites range from the station landfill to a paint locker to an explosives burning ground.

References

External links

 

Weapons and ammunition installations of the United States Navy
Ammunition depots of the U.S. Department of Defense
Buildings and structures in Orange County, California
Seal Beach, California